Isaiah 29 is the twenty-ninth chapter of the Book of Isaiah in the Hebrew Bible or the Old Testament of the Christian Bible. This book contains the prophecies attributed to the prophet Isaiah, and is one of the Book of the Prophets. The Jerusalem Bible groups chapters 28-35 together as a collection of "poems on Israel and Judah".

Text
The original text was written in Hebrew language. This chapter is divided into 24 verses.

Textual witnesses
Some early manuscripts containing the text of this chapter in Hebrew are of the Masoretic Text tradition, which includes the Codex Cairensis (895), the Petersburg Codex of the Prophets (916), Aleppo Codex (10th century), Codex Leningradensis (1008).

Fragments containing parts of this chapter were found among the Dead Sea Scrolls (3rd century BC or later):
 1QIsaa: complete
 1QIsab: extant: verses 1‑8
 4QIsaf (4Q60): extant: verses 1‑8
 4QIsak (4Q64): extant: verses 1‑9

There is also a translation into Koine Greek known as the Septuagint, made in the last few centuries BCE. Extant ancient manuscripts of the Septuagint version include Codex Vaticanus (B; B; 4th century), Codex Sinaiticus (S; BHK: S; 4th century), Codex Alexandrinus (A; A; 5th century) and Codex Marchalianus (Q; Q; 6th century).

Parashot
The parashah sections listed here are based on the Aleppo Codex. Isaiah 29 is a part of the Prophecies about Judah and Israel (Isaiah 24–35). {P}: open parashah; {S}: closed parashah.
 {P} 29:1-8 {P} 29:9-12 {S} 29:13-14 {S} 29:15-21 {P} 29:22-24 {S}

A problem solved, a problem started (29:1–14)
This part contains two oracles which can be 'paired with complete ease'.

Verse 1
 "Woe to Ariel, to Ariel, the city where David dwelt!
 Add year to year;Let feasts come around"."Ariel": that is"Jerusalem", lit. "Lion of God".
The name given to Jerusalem in verses 1-7 is "Ariel": God will bring distress upon Ariel, and will make her like "an ariel". The Encyclopedia Judaica suggests that the word is derived from a root, ari, meaning "to burn", similar to the Arabic word ʿiratun, meaning "hearth", such that Isaiah expects that Jerusalem will "become like the altar, i.e., a scene of holocaust"  (compare verse 6).

"Dwelt": Robert Lowth's nineteenth century version, Brenton's Septuagint Translation, and the New English Translation render "dwelt" (ḥā·nāh) as "besieged", recalling the events of  when David and his men captured the stronghold of Zion from the Jebusites.

Verse 6you will be visited by the Lord of hostswith thunder and with earthquake and great noise,with whirlwind and tempest, and the flame of a devouring fire."Visited" (KJV, ESV): is rendered as "punished" in NKJV and MEV.

Verse 10For the Lord has poured out on you the spirit of deep sleepand has closed your eyes, the prophets;and He has covered your heads, the seers.The word tar·dê·māh, translated as "deep sleep", reflects the deep sleep which the Lord God caused to fall on Adam in Genesis 2:21.

Spiritual transformation (29:15–24)
The poem in this part can be divided into 3 sections (just as the theme of the opening three 'woes') offering 'a meditation on the theme of transformation'.
The first transformation: the subverting of reason (verses 15–16)
The second transformation: coming world renewal (verses 17–21)
The third transformation: the changed fortune of Jacob (verses 22–24)

Verse 22Therefore thus says the Lord, who redeemed Abraham, concerning the house of Jacob:Jacob shall not now be ashamed,nor shall his face now turn pale;'' 
The Cambridge Bible for Schools and Colleges argues that "[this] clause is suspicious, both from its position in the original, and from its contents. There is no incident in the biblical history of Abraham to which the expression "redeem" is specially appropriate; there is, however, a late Jewish legend about his being delivered from a fiery death prepared for him by his heathen relations (Book of Jubilees, chapter 12). The words may be a late interpolation."

See also
Abraham
Ariel (angel)
Jacob
Jerusalem
Lebanon
Related Bible parts: Matthew 15, Mark 7, Revelation 2

References

Sources

External links

Jewish
Isaiah 29 Original Hebrew with Parallel English

Christian
Isaiah 29 English Translation with Parallel Latin Vulgate

29